The 1930 Chicago Cubs season was the 59th season of the Chicago Cubs franchise, the 55th in the National League and the 15th at Wrigley Field. The Cubs were managed by Joe McCarthy and Rogers Hornsby for the final four games of the season. They finished in second place in Major League Baseball's National League with a record of 90–64. In the peak year of the lively ball era, the Cubs scored 998 runs, third most in the majors. Future Hall of Famers Kiki Cuyler, Gabby Hartnett, and Hack Wilson led the offense.

Regular season 
Hack Wilson set a major league record for most RBIs in one season with 191. Wilson's 1930 season was considered one of the best ever by a hitter. In addition to hitting 56 home runs, leading the league with 105 walks, and boasting a batting average of .356, he drove in 191 runs, a mark that remains one of the most untouchable MLB records. (For years, record books gave the total as 190, until research in 1999 showed that an RBI credited by an official scorer to Charlie Grimm actually belonged to Wilson.) He recorded that total without hitting a grand slam.

Season standings

Record vs. opponents

Roster

Player stats

Batting

Starters by position 
Note: Pos = Position; G = Games played; AB = At bats; H = Hits; Avg. = Batting average; HR = Home runs; RBI = Runs batted in

Other batters 
Note: G = Games played; AB = At bats; H = Hits; Avg. = Batting average; HR = Home runs; RBI = Runs batted in

Pitching

Starting pitchers 
Note: G = Games pitched; IP = Innings pitched; W = Wins; L = Losses; ERA = Earned run average; SO = Strikeouts

Other pitchers 
Note: G = Games pitched; IP = Innings pitched; W = Wins; L = Losses; ERA = Earned run average; SO = Strikeouts

Relief pitchers 
Note: G = Games pitched; W = Wins; L = Losses; SV = Saves; ERA = Earned run average; SO = Strikeouts

Awards and honors

League top five finishers 
Kiki Cuyler
 MLB leader in stolen bases (37)
 #2 in NL in runs scored (155)
 #3 in NL in RBI (134)

Woody English
 #3 in NL in runs scored (152)

Gabby Hartnett
 #4 in NL in home runs (37)

Pat Malone
 NL leader in wins (20)
 #3 in NL in strikeouts (142)
 #4 in NL in ERA (3.94)

Charlie Root
 #4 in NL in strikeouts (124)

Hack Wilson
 MLB leader in home runs (56)
 MLB leader in RBI (191)
 NL leader in slugging percentage (.723)
 #3 in NL in on-base percentage (.454)
 #4 in NL in runs scored (146)

Farm system

Notes

References 
1930 Chicago Cubs season at Baseball Reference

Chicago Cubs seasons
Chicago Cubs season
Chicago Cubs